Alois Höller (born 15 March 1989) is an Austrian footballer who plays for SV Mattersburg in the Austrian Bundesliga.

References

Austrian footballers
Austrian Football Bundesliga players
2. Liga (Austria) players
SV Mattersburg players
1989 births
Living people
Association football midfielders